The 40th CARIFTA Games was held at the Montego Bay Sports Complex in Montego Bay, Jamaica, on April 23–25, 2011.  Initially, the games should be hosted for the second
time after 2007 by Saint Kitts and
Nevis, but they declared to be unable to stage the games because of financial issues.  The games could have been cancelled for the first time in its history,
but Jamaica finally agreed to host the games at short notice.

Detailed reports on the results were given.

Records

A total of 8 new games records were set.

Key

Austin Sealy Award

The Austin Sealy Trophy for the
most outstanding athlete of the games was awarded to Anthonique Strachan
of the Bahamas. She won two gold medals (100 m, and 200 m) in
the junior (U-20) category equalling Veronica Campbell's 200 metres games
record.

Medal summary

Complete results can be found on the games' website and on the World Junior Athletics History
website.

Boys under 20 (Junior)

: Open event for both junior and youth athletes.

Girls under 20 (Junior)

: Open event for both junior and youth athletes.

Boys under 17 (Youth)

Girls under 17 (Youth)

Medal table (unofficial)

Participation (unofficial)

Detailed result lists can be found on the games' website and
on the World Junior Athletics History website. An unofficial
count yields the number of about 453 athletes (238 junior (under-20) and 215
youth (under-17)) from about 27 countries.  The lists contain the names of 12
athletes assigned to the Netherlands Antilles.  Rather, after its
dissolution in October 2010, teams 
from two successor states were participating: nine athletes from Curaçao, and three from Sint Maarten.

There athletes from French Saint Martin were aksi part of the team from Guadeloupe.

 (3)
 (10)
 (5)
 (62)
 (41)
 (1)
 (33)
 (8)
 (8)
 (9)
 (10)
/ (9)
 (19)
/ (19)
 (5)
 (7)
 (71)
/ (16)
 (2)
 (9)
 (10)
 (4)
 (3)
 (8)
 (61)
 (16)
 (4)

References

External links
World Junior Athletics History

CARIFTA Games
2011 in Jamaican sport
CARIFTA Games
2011 in Caribbean sport
International athletics competitions hosted by Jamaica